Odette Gartenlaub (13 March 1922 – 20 September 2014) was a French pianist, music teacher and composer.

Biography
Odette Gartenlaub studied music at the Paris Conservatory with Olivier Messiaen, Henri Busser, Noël Gallon and Darius Milhaud, and won the Premier Grand Prix de Rome in 1948. She became well known as a soloist, performing with orchestras internationally. The daughter of Jewish parents, she was forced to abandon her studies at the Paris Conservatoire in September 1941 when the Conservatoire enforced statutes banning the attendance of Jews at the institution in the era of Nazi-occupied Paris. In 1959 she took a position as a professor at the Paris Conservatory.

On September 20, 2014, she died at Hôpital Cochin in Paris, at the age of 92.

Works
Gartenlaub's compositions include works for orchestra, chamber ensemble and solo instruments. Selected works include:

Étude concertante (1984) for viola solo
Pour le Cor (1968) for horn and piano
Les Coin des Enfants (1971) for piano
Antique
Grave et Toccata (1968) for piano
Sept Petit Études
Trois Caracteres (1974) for trombone and piano or orchestra; Paris Conservatory contest piece in 1974 and 1981

References

1922 births
2014 deaths
20th-century classical composers
French classical composers
French women classical composers
Conservatoire de Paris alumni
Academic staff of the Conservatoire de Paris
Prix de Rome for composition
20th-century French women musicians
20th-century French composers
Women music educators
Commandeurs of the Ordre des Arts et des Lettres
20th-century women composers